Isabelline may refer to:

Isabelline style, or Isabelline, a late medieval architectural style developed under the reign of Isabella I of Castile
Isabelline (colour), a pale grey-yellowish or parchment colour—an off-white colour often used to describe animals
Isabelline bush-hen (Amaurornis isabellina), also isabelline waterhen, a large rail
Isabelline shrike (Lanius isabellinus), member of the shrike family (Laniidae)
Isabelline wheatear (Oenanthe isabellina), small passerine bird 
Parties and factions in Isabelline Spain